Canterbury District Soccer Football Association is a governing body and football (soccer) competition located in the Canterbury suburbs of Sydney. Its administrative headquarters are located at Pratten Park Bowls, Ashfield, New South Wales. All competitions and football activity is under control of Football New South Wales. The District Association consists of ten all ages competitions which corresponds to tiers six to fifteen on the Australian soccer pyramid. Clubs are located in the Burwood, Canada Bay, Canterbury-Bankstown, Inner West and Strathfield local council areas.

History
Canterbury Districts Soccer Football Association was founded in 1922; the first year of competition was 1923.

Teams and structure

Tiers
As of 2013, the Canterbury Districts Premier League and Premier League Reserves competitions have been scrapped to align with the national curriculum overhaul which included the introduction of the National Premier Leagues. The Canterbury Districts highest all ages competition sits on the sixth tier of the Australian soccer league system. There are a total of 12 all age divisions.

Leagues
Canterbury District Soccer Football Association is responsible for overseeing all men's, women's and junior's competitions as well as small sided competitions.

Teams
Teams competing across all tiers and divisions are made up from these clubs:
 Abbotsford Football Club
 Ashfield Pirates Football Club
 Australian National Sports Club
 Balmain & District Football Club
 Belmore Eagles Football Club
 Belmore United Football Club
 Burwood Football Club (Owned by a Brazilian Freak Football Player)
 Canterbury Football Club
 Concord Soccer Club
 Cooks River Titans Football Club
 Earlwood Wanderers Football Club
 Enfield Rovers Soccer Club
 Football Club Five Dock
Fraser Park Football Club
 Hurlstone Park Wanderers Football Club
 Inter Lions Soccer Club
Lakemba Sports and recreational Club
 Leichhardt Saints Football Club
 APIA Leichhardt Tigers Football Club
 Marrickville Football Club
 Roseland Raptors Football Club
 Stanmore Hawks Football Club
 Strathfield Football Club
 Sydney Uni Soccer Football Club
 Russell Lea Women's Soccer Club

Clubs may field more than one team per all ages division and may also not participate in each division

Premiers

Premier League
 2002: Belmore Eagles A
 2003: Australian National Sports Club
 2004: Abbotsford FC
 2006: Concord
 2007: Concord
 2011: Enfield
 2012: Enfield (def. Inter Lions 6–1 in grand final)

Premier League Reserves
 2002: Marrickville B
 2003: Marrickville
 2004: Inter Lions
 2006: Inter Lions
 2007: Concord
 2012: Enfield (def. Inter Lions 1–0 in grand final)

All-ages

State Cup winners
Teams have represented the Canterbury District at State Cup tournaments since its foundation in 1957. Hurlstone Park Wanderers managed to win the U-21s foundation title that year.

  
  Club has dissolved
 Glebe are no longer a part of the Canterbury Districts Soccer Football Association

References

External links
 Canterbury District Soccer Football Association Official Website

Soccer leagues in New South Wales
South
1923 establishments in Australia
Sports organizations established in 1923